Halenia (spurred gentian) is a genus of plant in family Gentianaceae. It contains the following species (but this list may be incomplete):

 Halenia alleniana, Standl. ex Wilbur
 Halenia aquilegiella, Standl.
 Halenia brevicornis, (Kunth) G. Don
 Halenia corniculata, (L.) Cornaz
 Halenia crumiana, Wilbur 
 Halenia decumbens, C.K. Allen
 Halenia deflexa, (Sm.) Griseb.
 Halenia elliptica, D. Don
 Halenia kalbreyeri, Gilg
 Halenia longicaulis, J.S. Pringle
 Halenia minima, C.K. Allen
 Halenia palmeri, A. Gray
 Halenia plantaginea, C.K. Allen
 Halenia pringlei, B.L. Rob. & Seaton
 Halenia pulchella, Gilg
 Halenia recurva, C.K. Allen
 Halenia rhyacophila, C.K. Allen
 Halenia rusbyi, Gilg
 Halenia schiedeana, Griseb.
 Halenia serpyllifolia, J.S. Pringle
 Halenia taruga-gasso, Gilg
 Halenia viridis, Gilg
 Halenia weddelliana, Gilg

References

 
Gentianaceae genera
Taxonomy articles created by Polbot